The Message may refer to:

Film
 The Message (1918 film), starring A. V. Bramble
 The Message (1976 film), an Islamic epic drama by Moustapha Akkad
 The Message (2009 film), a Chinese espionage thriller directed by Chen Kuo-fu and Gao Qunshu

Literature
 The Message (Bible), a 2002 contemporary rendering of the Holy Bible
 The Message (novel), a 1996 Animorphs novel by K. A. Applegate
 "The Message" (short story), a 1956 story by Isaac Asimov
 "The Message", a 2009 short story by Andrew J. McKiernan

Music
 The Message (Sirius XM), an American radio station

Albums
 The Message (Andrea Begley album) or the title song, 2013
 The Message (Chi Coltrane album) or the title song, 1986
 The Message (Grandmaster Flash and the Furious Five album) or the title song (see below), 1982
 The Message (Illinois Jacquet album) or the title song, 1963
 The Message (EP) or the title song, by Breed 77, 1998
 The Message, by 4Him, 1996
 The Message, by Gerry Weil, or the title song, 1971
 The Message, by J. R. Monterose, 1959

Songs
 "The Message" (Cymande song), 1972
 "The Message" (Grandmaster Flash and the Furious Five song), 1982
 "The Message", by Béla Fleck and the Flecktones from Three Flew Over the Cuckoo's Nest, 1993
 "The Message", by Budd Johnson from Budd Johnson and the Four Brass Giants, 1960
 "The Message", by Dr. Dre from 2001, 1999
 "The Message", by M.I.A. from Maya, 2010
 "The Message", by Nas from It Was Written, 1996
 "The Message", by Power Quest from Magic Never Dies, 2005
 "The Message", by Sofia Shinas, 1992

Television
 The Message (Philippine TV program), a religious show
 The Message (TV series), a 2006 British surreal comedy series

Episodes
 "The Message" (Animorphs episode)
 "The Message" (Firefly)
 "The Message" (The Outer Limits)
 "The Message" (Prison Break)
 "The Message" (Steven Universe)

Other
 The Message (podcast), a 2015 science fiction podcast
 The Message Trust, a Christian youth charity based in Manchester, UK
 The Message, a political party in Libya
The Message, a 1999 comedy album by Eddie Griffin
 "The Message", a term referring to the teachings of the evangelist William M. Branham

See also
 Get the Message (disambiguation)
 Message (disambiguation)